Club Telex Noise Ensemble was a short-lived musical side-project of the Club Telex electro night of Tampere, Finland, combining improvisation and experimental music to electro music and even lounge music. Its members were Mikko "DJ mini" Niemelä (of Polytron), pHinn (of Kompleksi), Antti Koivumäki and Mikko Ojanen (of Nu Science). Also Olli Sotamaa, Kaj Mäkelä and Antti Vuorio participated in Club Telex Noise Ensemble. Club Telex Noise Ensemble did only three live performances between December 2000 and April 2001; one of them as the encore of the gig of Chicks on Speed in Tampere, March 2001. The CDR Just To Disturb You A Little Bit (June 2001) was compiled of these live performances. A remix compilation CTNERMX (March 2003) was based on these tracks, featuring such artists as Kemialliset Ystävät, Legowelt, Kompleksi, Luke Eargoggle, Massaccesi, Tuomas Rantanen and Unidentified Sound Objects.
Delta Recordings, a label from London, UK, released a 4-track 12" vinyl sampler of these tracks in early 2004.
The second remix compilation, CTNERMX II, is planned for 2006, featuring such artists as Maxx Klaxon.

Singles discography 
 CTNERMX (with remixes from Legowelt, Luke Eargoggle, 8-Bit Rockers and Andrew Duke, Delta B Recordings (UK), 12", 2004)

Albums discography 
 Just To Disturb You A Little Bit (pHinnMilk Recordings, CDR, 2001)
 CTNERMX (a remix compilation by various artists, pHinnMilk Recordings, CDR, 2003)
 CTNERMX II (a remix compilation by various artists, pHinnMilk Recordings, CDR, 2006)

Official link 
Club Telex Noise Ensemble

Finnish musical groups